Yassi Mazandi, born in Tehran, Iran, lives and works in Los Angeles, California.  Mazandi is a sculptor, painter and social activist.

Personal life and education

1980-81 studied at Beechlawn College, Oxford, England.  1992-95 Greenwich House Pottery, New York, NY.

Exhibitions and Residencies

Public Collections

Cleveland Museum of Art, Cleveland, Ohio
Los Angeles County Museum of Art, LACMA, Los Angeles, California
Roanoke College (Permanent Art Collection), Salem, Virginia
University of California, Art, Design & Architecture Museum, 
Santa Barbara, California

Solo exhibitions

2022-2023: Yassi Mazandi: Language of the Birds, Los Angeles County Museum of Art, LACMA, Los Angeles, California
2022: Yassi Mazandi: In Flight, Honor Fraser Gallery, Los Angeles, California
2018-2019: Yassi Mazandi in Residence, Carolyn Glasoe Bailey Foundation, Ojai, California 2016: Yassi Mazandi: Germs on Sheets, Maloney Fine Art, Los Angeles, California
2014: Yassi Mazandi: Sacred Wheel, Maloney Fine Art, Los Angeles, California
2009: Architectonic: Yassi Mazandi, JF Chen, Los Angeles, California
2007: Yassi Mazandi: Sculpted Ceramics, Allegra Hicks, London, England
2007: Yassi Mazandi: Sculpted Vessels, FLUX Gallery, Los Angeles, California
 2014 Maloney Fine Art, Los Angeles, CA 
 2008 Architectonic, JF Chen, Los Angeles, CA
 2007 Yassi, Allegra Hicks, London, England 
 2006 Yassi Mazandi, Flux Gallery Los Angeles, CA

Residencies

2021: Artist in Residence, Gazell.io Digital Art House, London, England
2018 - 2019: Artist in Residence, Carolyn Glasoe Bailey Foundation, Ojai, California 2018 - 2019: 
Art & Social Practice Resident Artist, ProjectArt, Los Angeles, California 2016: 
Artist in Residence, BoxoPROJECTS, Joshua Tree, California
2012: 
Artist in Residence, Robert Rauschenberg Foundation, Captiva Island, Florida

Group exhibitions

2023-2024 (upcoming): Women Defining Women in Contemporary Art of the Middle East and Beyond, Phoenix Art Museum, Phoenix, Arizona
2023 (upcoming): Women Defining Women in Contemporary Art of the Middle East and Beyond, Los Angeles County Museum of Art, Los Angeles, California
2022: Symbiosis curated by Beth Rudin DeWoody and produced by Laura Dvorkin, Berkshire Botanical Garden, Stockbridge, Massachusetts
2022: Fragile / Fiber, Carolyn Glasoe Bailey Foundation, Ojai, California
2022: Totum, Los Angeles Installation, curated by Kyle DeWoody, Los Angeles, California
2021: Totum curated by Kyle DeWoody, Black Claro Walnut Farm, Ojai, California
2021: The Bunker Artspace, 
2021/2022 Season curated by Beth Rudin DeWoody, Laura Dvorkin and Maynard Monrow, West Palm Beach, Florida
2021: Pictures at an Exhibition featuring Frost Symphony Orchestra and Gerard Schwarz, co-presented by the Adrienne Arsht Center, Frost School of Music and Lowe Art Museum, Miami, Florida
2021: Disassembly Line curated by Pietro Alexander and Sasha Filimonov, co-presented by Molly Barnes and SPY Projects, Molly’s Garage, Beverly Hills, California
2021: OpenSea’s First Virtual Gallery Takeover, Gazell.io x OpenSea x Spatial.io, Metaverse 
2021: Irresistible Delights, University of California, Art, Design & Architecture Museum,
Santa Barbara, California
2021: Once Upon a Time, Advocartsy Gallery, Los Angeles, California
2021: Art Beyond Survival curated by Damon Martin, Arts District, Los Angeles, California 
2021: All Tomorrow’s Parties curated by Michael Slenske, domicile (n.), Los Angeles, California 
2021: Vessel, Telluride Gallery of Fine Art, Telluride, Colorado
2021: Ephemeral Tranquility curated by Samantha Meyer, Roanoke College, Salem, Virginia
2020: Cave Painting, Painted Cave presented by Carolyn Glasoe Bailey Foundation, Hotel Indigo, Santa Barbara, California
2020: 2 Day, LSH CoLab, Los Angeles, California
2019: Fierce Generosity 2.0, Burnet Fine Art, Minneapolis, Minnesota
2019: ProjectArt Artist Exhibition, Redling Fine Art at Tin Flats, Los Angeles, California
2019: Bombay Beach Biennale, Bombay Beach, California
2019: SPRING/BREAK Art Show (by invitation), The Stalls at Skylight ROW DLTA, Los Angeles, California
2018-2019: Surreal By Nature presented by Carolyn Glasoe Bailey Foundation, Hotel Indigo, Santa Barbara, California
2018: The Other Art Fair presented by Saatchi Art (by invitation), Santa Monica, California
2018: My Kid Could Do That, The Underground Museum, Los Angeles, California
2018: Bombay Beach Biennale, Bombay Beach, California
2017: Legacy: Highlights from the Roanoke College Permanent Collection, Olin Gallery, Salem, Virginia
2017: All The Small Things, Steve Turner Contemporary, Los Angeles, California
2017: “Wouldn’t it be nice if we could dream together?”, Diane Rosenstein Gallery, Los Angeles, California
2017: Converge 45 curated by Kristy Edmunds, Hoffman Gallery (OCAC), Portland, Oregon 
2017: Bombay Beach Biennale, Bombay Beach, California
2017: Material Art Fair - Mexico City, Grice Bench Gallery, Los Angeles, California
2016: All-In, Club Pro Gallery, Los Angeles, California
2016: Intersectionality curated by Richard Haden, Museum of Contemporary Art, North Miami, Florida
2014: Art is Hope curated by René-Julien Praz, PIASA, Paris, France
2014: Intangible Beauty: Beautiful Women and the Endless Void, Kasher|Potamkin Gallery, New York, New York
 2013 Angel Art Auction, Los Angeles, CA 
 2012 Of White, Nuartlink Contemporary, Westport, CT
 2011 Superba, JF Chen, Los Angeles, CA
 2011 The January White Sale, Loretta Howard Gallery, New York, NY 
 2010 SHIFT, Los Angeles, CA
 2001 The Mixed Show, Red Barn, South Hampton, NY 
 1996 Japan American Ceramics, Japanese Society, New York, NY

Residencies
 2012 Rauschenberg Residency, Captiva Island, FL

References and Notes

External links
Official website of Yassi Mazandi

Living people
Iranian artists
Year of birth missing (living people)